The 17th Moscow International Film Festival was held from 8 to 19 July 1991. The Golden St. George was awarded to the Soviet-German film Spotted Dog Running at the Edge of the Sea directed by Karen Gevorkian.

Jury
 Oleg Yankovsky (Soviet Union – President of the Jury)
 Márta Mészáros (Hungary)
 Gabriele Rohrer-Kumlin (Germany)
 Kang Soo-yeon (South Korea)
 Michèle Mercier (France)
 Dušan Makavejev (Yugoslavia)
 Luigi Magni (Italy)
 Manuel Gutiérrez Aragón (Spain)

Films in competition
The following films were selected for the main competition:

Awards
 Golden St. George: Spotted Dog Running at the Edge of the Sea by Karen Gevorkian
 Special Silver St. George:
 The Adjuster by Atom Egoyan
 The Wedding Maidens by Jin Wang
 Silver St. George:
 Actor: Mustafa Nadarević, Branislav Lečić for Silent Gunpowder
 Actress: Isabelle Huppert for Madame Bovary
 Special Mention: Homework by Jaime Humberto Hermosillo
 Prix FIPRESCI: Spotted Dog Running at the Edge of the Sea by Karen Gevorkian
 Special Diplomas: Matti Manushulu by B. Narsing Rao
 Special Mention: A Woman Between Two Brothers by Amir Karakulov (non-competition film)
 Prix of Ecumenical Jury: Spotted Dog Running at the Edge of the Sea by Karen Gevorkian
 Special Mention: Walerjan Wrobel's Homesickness by Rolf Schübel

References

External links
Moscow International Film Festival: 1991 at Internet Movie Database

1991
1991 film festivals
1991 in the Soviet Union
1991 in Moscow
Moscow
July 1991 events in Russia